Homer Austin Smith (October 9, 1931 – April 10, 2011) was an American football player and coach.  He served as the head football coach at Davidson College (1965–1969), the University of the Pacific (1970–1971), and the United States Military Academy (1974–1978), compiling a career college football record 53–71–1 and a bowl record of 0–1.  Smith was also the offensive coordinator at the University of California, Los Angeles (1972–1973, 1980–1986, 1990–1993), the University of Alabama (1988–1989, 1994–1995), and the University of Arizona (1996), and for the Kansas City Chiefs of the National Football League (NFL). In 1997, Smith was a finalist for the Broyles Award, given annually to the nation's top college football assistant coach.

Smith was named 1977 Eastern College Conference Coach of the Year and was presented an Outstanding Achievement Award by the American Football Coaches Association in 2006. As a player, he was a two-time All-East and All-Ivy League fullback at Princeton University.  As a coach, Smith has his most success as offensive coordinator at UCLA where he paired with Terry Donahue to lead the Bruins to multiple Rose Bowls and top ten finishes.

In addition to his undergraduate degree from Princeton, he also received post-graduate degrees from Stanford Business School and Harvard Divinity School.

Smith died in 2011.

Head coaching record

References

External links
 

1931 births
2011 deaths
American football fullbacks
Air Force Falcons football coaches
Army Black Knights football coaches
Davidson Wildcats football coaches
Kansas City Chiefs coaches
Pacific Tigers football coaches
Princeton Tigers football players
Stanford Cardinal football coaches
Sportspeople from Omaha, Nebraska
Stanford Graduate School of Business alumni
Harvard Divinity School alumni